Hassan Nisar (Punjabi,; born 5 July 1951) is a Pakistani journalist, newspaper columnist, TV news analyst and an Urdu Poet.

Early life

He completed his Matriculation and FA from Faisalabad and then moved to Punjab University Lahore to pursue his higher studies. He studied Journalism and Economics at Punjab University Lahore.

Career
Hassan Nisar started his career first as a journalist. Later he became a TV talk show host on Choraha on Geo News in 2008 and a political commentator on TV talk show Meray Mutabiq.

Bibliography
Caurāhā, 1996. 
Zindah insān kā alamiyyah, 1999. 
Kāle qol, 2017.

References

External links
'Report Card' on Geo News (Pakistani TV Talk Show on YouTube)

1951 births
Living people
Pakistani male journalists
Pakistani columnists
Geo News newsreaders and journalists
Punjabi people
University of the Punjab alumni
People from Faisalabad
Urdu-language journalists
Urdu-language columnists
21st-century Urdu-language writers